Ballantyne is a neighborhood and developing edge city on the southside of Charlotte, North Carolina, occupying a  area of land adjacent to the South Carolina border. The neighborhood is home to St. Matthew Catholic Church, the largest Catholic congregation in the United States.

In June 2013, Wingate University announced that it was moving its Matthews campus to Ballantyne.

History
Ballantyne was originally a large hunting tract owned by the Harris family, descendants of former North Carolina governor Cameron A. Morrison. In 1992, Johnny Harris and his brother-in-law, Smoky Bissell, started Ballantyne Corporate Park, which has become one of the most successful master-planned communities in the United States. Harris had the 2,000 acres rezoned, the largest in Mecklenburg county history. Another developer, Crescent Resources, had already purchased the 610 acres that would later become the Ballantyne Country Club and the accompanying residential development. In October 1995, Bissell bought out his brothers-in-law’s shares for $20 million and established Ballantyne, named after his great aunt. Bissell also developed and designed the Ballantyne Hotel, which opened in September 2001.

At the intersection of Johnston Road and Ballantyne Commons stand four 30-foot monuments representing transportation, technology, finance, and the human spirit of Charlotte. The art installation was commissioned by Yugoslavian artist Boris Tomic, who spent three years crafting them at a brick factory in Salisbury.

Ballantyne Corporate Park
Ballantyne Corporate Park is a  business park. Brighthouse Financial, TIAA, and Wells Fargo also have a major corporate presence in Ballantyne.

In 2010, Ballantyne Corporate Park was recognized as International Office Park of the Year by the Building Owners and Managers Association International (BOMA).

In April 2013 it was announced that MetLife Inc. had agreed to leased  in the park.  That space was in the entire new 10 story Gragg building and 2 floors of the twin Woodward building.  At the time the deal closed it was the park's largest deal.  MetLife's 1,300 employees moved into the buildings in November 2012.
  
In November 2014 TIAA-CREFF announced plans to the six-story  Betsill office building in the park. This vacancy was created by Bank of America's announcement to vacate the building by the end of 2014. 
   
The building was built as a speculative building by then owner of the park the Bissell organization. The building completed in November 2016 and Wells Fargo began occupying it in early 2017. The initial plan was to eventually house 1,600 Wells Fargo employees in the building.

In July 2016 MetLife announced it will be spinning off its US retail business to form Charlotte based Brighthouse Financial.  At the time of the announcement Metlife had 1,500 local employees.  They were leasing the entire Gragg building and a portion of the Woodward building in the Corporate Park.  The creation of Brighthouse gave Charlotte another fortune 500, the company was 342 on the list with $8.97 billion in revenue in 2018.    
  
In 2017, H.C. "Smoky" Bissell, who developed Ballantyne Corporate Park, sold the development for $1.2 billion to Northwood Investors, becoming the largest transaction in Charlotte real estate history.  The deal was also the third largest US office deal in the first half of 2017 according to data collected by Yardi Matrix. The deal was 41 separate transactions totaling $1.2 billion.  The transactions ranged in size from the Woodward Building and Gragg Building for $165 million to The Goddard School at 13820 Ballantyne Corporate Place purchased for $1.7 million.   John Kukral, president and CEO of Northwood Investors said this about the purchase “We are excited that the Bissell team will join Northwood and help lead the next phase of Ballantyne Corporate Park. This transaction represents one of our largest acquisitions to date and reinforces our commitment to Charlotte”.  Northwood has been active in the Charlotte area since the 2011 creation of Northwood Ravin which is a multifamily development company based in Charlotte.  At the time of the purchase Northwood owned and managed Blakeney in south Charlotte and Latta Arcade in Uptown.

In October 2019 Northwood Ravin announced the park's first apartment tower. The 16-story building with an attached low-rise building were planned to have 212 apartments. The name of the apartment complex is Towerview at Ballantyne. It delivered in the spring of 2021. The building was part of the early stages of Ballantyne Reimagined.

In May 2021 the park had  of office space with 80% of it leased. It was the first office build to deliver under Northwood Ravin's ownership of the corporate park. In April 2022 Credit Karma announced it was leasing  in the Overlook building to establish an east coast headquarters in Charlotte. At the time of the announcement the company employed 450 people locally with plans to add 600 additional jobs by 2026. With this new tentant the building was 46% leased with  still available.  

In October 2022 XPO Logistics announced they will be spinning off RXO as a separate proprietary tech-enabled truckload brokerage company.    XPO Logistics has a large office in the Corporate Park and 837 employees.  The new company will be based in the Corporate Park, the Woodard Building at 11215 North Community House Road, where they will be leasing .  The new company will 750 local employees and 5,600 total employees with $4.7 billion in annual revenue.  The IPO should go live on the New York Stock Exchange on November 1, 2022.  

In an effort to transform Ballantyne from a corporate park into a walk-able, dense community, Northwood announced plans to construct a 25-acre mixed-use development on the current site of The Golf Club at Ballantyne. Phase I of the development includes 1,200 multifamily units,  of retail, a 3,5000-seat amphitheater,  multiple parks, and a greenway. In May 2022 Northwood Investors gave more details about this phase, it will include  of retail space and 350 apartments in a 26-story residential high rise. Ballantyne's first brewery.

Ballantyne Village
Ballantyne Village is a 171,000 square foot mixed used development (excluding the Panorama Tower).  It was purchased by American Realty Advisors and Stonemar Properties for $43.2 million in 2017.  Previously it was purchased by Charlotte-based Vision Ventures and Mount Vernon Asset Management for $26 million in 2013.  It includes a number of restaurants, personal care business, 25,000 square feet of office space with an additional 53,000 square of office being developed in place of the Regal Ballantyne Village that closed in 2020   
, and outdoor gathering space.  One of the most notable tenants is Blackfinn Ameripub which employees 125 people, occupies 7,500 square feet, and has a popular outdoor seating area.  Blackfinn has been a tenant since 2016.

Panorama Tower
In July 2019 Charlotte-based Panorama Holdings broke ground on the Panorama Tower in Ballantyne Village, it is expected to deliver in the second quarter of 2021.  It is a 14 story mixed used building.  At an estimated height of 182 feet it is one of the tallest buildings in Ballantyne.  It includes a 186-room AC Hotel by Marriott and 100,000 square feet of office space, and a rooftop restaurant.  Part of the plan for the office space is co working space, which is a part of the office market that Ballantyne that is under represented.  The land was acquired in two separate transactions a .6 acre plot and a .5 acre for a combined totaled of $6.7 million   paid in 2017.  The project has been financed with a $66 million loan through Medalist Capital.  Jane Wu, president of Panorama Holdings, said this about the project “Panorama Tower is a first for the Ballantyne area and brings new and exciting urban amenities to one of Charlotte’s top submarkets. Ballantyne already has great office, hotel and dining, so our goal is to offer something unique within each use.  It’s rare to see Class A office built over a hotel, and our restaurant will offer views like no other.”

Hotels are lacking in Ballantyne.  The only hotels prior to the tower were the Ballantyne Hotel and three hotels in the corporate park.  This hotel is the third AC hotel in Charlotte, one in uptown and in one in South Park. It will occupy the first seven floors of the building.  The AC lifestyle brand of Marriott is known for its modern designs which includes guest rooms featuring high finishes and fixtures,  large picture windows, and touches of European inspiration.  Some of the other unique features include European inspired dishes as part of the hotel restaurant, a fitness center, and  16th floor ballroom that can host weddings and corporate events.  The hotel is expected to open to guests in September.

In October 2022 the building signed three new tenants.  Panorama Holdings, the project developer will be moving in a  space. Reinsurer PartnerRe will be leasing .  ServisFirst Bank will be leasing .  This is  ServisFirst's first Charlotte office, the company's 9 local employees will occupy the space in December 2022.  However, the space can accommodate 35 to 40 employees.  The bank is currently looking to grow their Charlotte presence by creating a Lake Norman area office and hiring a market president to serve that area.  Lee Millian, the new president will start on October 24, 2022.

Demographics

As of 2011, Ballantyne had a population of 20,936. The racial makeup of the neighborhood was 69.2% White American, 11.3% Asian American, 10.3% Black or African American, and 2.5% of some other race. Hispanic or Latino American of any race were 6.7% of the population. The median household income for the area was $96,435.

Controversies

On April 14, 2012, residents met to discuss an idea of breaking away from the city of Charlotte to form their own city. In the history of North Carolina, this has never been done before. If it is done, the residents will name the new city Providence. However, there is currently a North Carolina community that already carries this name and has its own zip code. Due to a layout that combines a variety of land uses and densities plus a reliance on vehicular journeys, traffic congestion in the area has been a consistent problem.

Printed media
Ballantyne magazine

Notable residents 
Allen Iverson, former NBA player, member of Naismith Memorial Basketball Hall of Fame
Blake Van Leer III film producer, investor, civil rights advocate and celebrity advisor

See also
 List of tallest buildings in Charlotte, North Carolina
 List of Charlotte neighborhoods
 Charlotte metropolitan area

References

External links

Ballantyne magazine

Neighborhoods in Charlotte, North Carolina